Eublemma perobliqua is a species of moth of the  family Erebidae. It is found in Kenya and Tanzania

References

Boletobiinae
Moths of Africa
Moths described in 1910